Alexandra Carla van Huffelen (born 21 July 1968) is a Dutch politician serving as State Secretary for Finance since 29 January 2020. A member of the Democrats 66 (D66) party, she was a member of the Senate from 2015 to 2020 and Director of the Gemeente Vervoerbedrijf from 2014 until 2020. She started her political career as an alderwoman in Rotterdam, holding the public space planning portfolio.

References

External links

Official
  Drs. A.C. (Alexandra) van Huffelen Parlement & Politiek
  Drs. A.C. van Huffelen (D66) Eerste Kamer der Staten-Generaal

 

1968 births
Living people
Aldermen of Rotterdam
Democrats 66 politicians
Dutch management consultants
Erasmus University Rotterdam alumni
Leiden University alumni
Members of the Senate (Netherlands)
Politicians from Leiden
Politicians from Utrecht (city)
State Secretaries for Finance of the Netherlands
Women government ministers of the Netherlands
20th-century Dutch civil servants
21st-century Dutch civil servants
21st-century Dutch women politicians
21st-century Dutch politicians